The Canton of Marquion is a former canton in the department of the Pas-de-Calais and in the Nord-Pas-de-Calais region of northern France. It was disbanded following the French canton reorganisation that came into effect in March 2015. It consisted of 17 communes, which all joined the canton of Bapaume in 2015. It had a total of 11,433 inhabitants (2012).

Geography 
The canton was organised around Marquion in the arrondissement of Arras.

The canton comprised 17 communes:

Baralle
Bourlon
Buissy
Écourt-Saint-Quentin
Épinoy
Graincourt-lès-Havrincourt
Inchy-en-Artois
Lagnicourt-Marcel
Marquion
Oisy-le-Verger
Palluel
Pronville
Quéant
Rumaucourt
Sains-lès-Marquion
Sauchy-Cauchy
Sauchy-Lestrée

Population

See also
Arrondissements of the Pas-de-Calais department
Cantons of Pas-de-Calais 
Communes of Pas-de-Calais

References

Marquion
2015 disestablishments in France
States and territories disestablished in 2015